Twenity 2000–2010 is a compilation album released by L'Arc-en-Ciel on February 16, 2011, simultaneously with Twenity 1991-1996 and Twenity 1997-1999. It collects previously released A-sides  and B-sides.

Track listing

2011 greatest hits albums
L'Arc-en-Ciel albums